The Panthera F9 is a UAE-designed 5-door armored personnel carrier designed for border protection, policing and low-intensity military operations. The vehicle is designed to have a fully modular weapons system, with a base model sold without any armament. The F9 comes equipped with a remote controlled, roof-mounted search light, run-flat tyres, a rear-view camera, air conditioning, as well as side and rear facing gun ports.

The base model F9 is produced by MSPV in the United Arab Emirates. The Panthera F9 is also produced at a military production plant located in Ankara, Turkey.

History
The Panthera F9 is officially used by the armed forces of the UAE and Egypt. Furthermore, Turkish-made Panthera F9s have been supplied as military aid to various armed groups in the Syrian Opposition during the ongoing Syrian Civil War, while UAE-made models were shown to be in possession of Field Marshal Khalifa Haftar's Tobruk-based Libyan National Army, during the course of the Second Libyan Civil War.

Variants
The company that designed and produced the F9, Minerva Special Purpose Vehicles (MSPV), partnered with French defense firm Nexter Systems to offer the M9 Panthera with a Nexter Systems ARX20 remote-controlled 20mm cannon, with an effective range of up to 1,200m. It may also employ a 7.62×51mm NATO belt-fed machine gun with up to 300 rounds, a GALIX Lacroix smoke discharger, as well as electronic fire detection and waste disposal systems.

Any F9 may optionally be fitted with a C4ISR surveillance system, electronic counter-measures, a non-lethal "STORM" or other custom configurations. It can also be fitted with a 360 degree ring mount, which can accept standard small arms.

The Panthera M9 is also offered in an armored ambulance configuration, holding up to 4 stretchers.

Several more vehicles of the Panthera family exist, with sizes ranging from 6 tonne to 23 tonne variants.

Operators

 
  Free Syrian Army
Syrian National Army
 National Front for Liberation
 Army of Glory
 
 
 Libyan National Army
 Libyan Army
 
 
  (delivery from December 2022)

References

External links

Armoured personnel carriers of the United Arab Emirates
Military vehicles of Turkey
Post–Cold War military equipment of Turkey
Armoured personnel carriers of the post–Cold War period
Wheeled armoured personnel carriers
Armoured personnel carriers
Military ambulances